Gary Michael "Garrett" Clayton (born March 19, 1991) is an American actor and singer. He is known for portraying Tanner in the 2013 Disney Channel movie Teen Beach Movie and its 2015 sequel Teen Beach 2, and other film, television, and stage roles.

Life and career 
Clayton was born March 19, 1991, in Dearborn, Michigan. He has Lebanese heritage. He began acting at Crestwood High School in Dearborn Heights, Michigan, performing in many of the drama club's productions. He later attended Oakland University, where he studied musical theater.

In 2010, he made appearances on Days of Our Lives and Shake It Up.  In December 2012, he appeared in the Lifetime movie Holiday Spin, co-starring Ralph Macchio, as Blake, a rebellious teen forced to live with his father after his mother is killed in a car accident.

He was cast in 2013 in the role of Tanner in Disney's musical Teen Beach Movie, playing a cool but vacuous surfer who is "a mix between Frankie Avalon and Link from Hairspray". The film was directed by Jeffrey Hornaday and was filmed in Puerto Rico and was first broadcast in July 2013. It co-stars Ross Lynch, Maia Mitchell, and Grace Phipps.

He had a recurring role in the latter half of the first season of The Fosters. In 2016, he portrayed gay porn star Brent Corrigan in the film King Cobra, with James Franco and Christian Slater, and played the role of Link Larkin in the NBC television broadcast of Hairspray Live! He starred as Brady Mannion in the horror-thriller film Don't Hang Up, which was released in theaters in February 2017. Also in 2017, Clayton appeared on stage at the Pasadena Playhouse as Luke alongside Al Pacino and Judith Light in a six-week run of Dotson Rader's play God Looked Away, about the later life of Tennessee Williams.

Personal life 
In 2018, Clayton revealed that he is gay and he has been in a long-term relationship with boyfriend Blake Knight since 2011. In January 2019, Clayton announced that he and Knight had become engaged a year prior. In September 2021, the couple married at an outdoor, garden party themed wedding in Los Angeles, which was officiated by Clayton's King Cobra co-star Alicia Silverstone.

Filmography

Films

Television

Stage

References

External links 
 
 

Living people
21st-century American male actors
American male film actors
American male child actors
American male television actors
Male actors from Michigan
American male dancers
American gay actors
Gay dancers
LGBT people from Michigan
People from Dearborn Heights, Michigan
Year of birth missing (living people)